B vitamins are a class of water-soluble vitamins that play important roles in cell metabolism and synthesis of red blood cells. Though these vitamins share similar names (B1, B2, B3, etc.), they are chemically distinct compounds that often coexist in the same foods. In general, dietary supplements containing all eight are referred to as a vitamin B complex. Individual B vitamin supplements are referred to by the specific number or name of each vitamin, such as B1 for thiamine, B2 for riboflavin, and B3 for niacin. Some are more commonly recognized by name than by number, for example pantothenic acid, biotin, and folate.

Each B vitamin is either a cofactor (generally a coenzyme) for key metabolic processes or is a precursor needed to make one.

List of B vitamins

Note: other substances once thought to be vitamins were given numbers in the B-vitamin numbering scheme, but were subsequently discovered to be either not essential for life or manufactured by the body, thus not meeting the two essential qualifiers for a vitamin. See section #Related compounds for numbers 4, 8, 10, 11, and others.

Sources
B vitamins are found in abundance in meat, eggs, and dairy products. Processed carbohydrates such as sugar and white flour tend to have lower B vitamin than their unprocessed counterparts. For this reason, it is required by law in many countries (including the United States) that the B vitamins thiamine, riboflavin, niacin, and folic acid be added back to white flour after processing. This is referred to as "enriched flour" on food labels. B vitamins are particularly concentrated in meat such as turkey, tuna and liver.

Sources for B vitamins also include spinach, legumes (pulses or beans), whole grains, asparagus, potatoes, bananas, chili peppers, breakfast cereals. 
The B12 vitamin is not abundantly available from plant products (although it has been found in moderate abundance in fermented vegetable products, certain seaweeds, and in certain mushrooms, with the bioavailability of the vitamin in these cases remaining uncertain), making B12 deficiency a legitimate concern for those maintaining a vegan diet. Manufacturers of plant-based foods will sometimes report B12 content, leading to confusion about what sources yield B12. The confusion arises because the standard US Pharmacopeia (USP) method for measuring the B12 content does not measure the B12 directly. Instead, it measures a bacterial response to the food. Chemical variants of the B12 vitamin found in plant sources are active for bacteria, but cannot be used by the human body. This same phenomenon can cause significant over-reporting of B12 content in other types of foods as well.

A common way to increase vitamin B intake is by using dietary supplements. B vitamins are commonly added to energy drinks, many of which have been marketed with large amounts of B vitamins.

Because they are soluble in water, excess B vitamins are generally readily excreted, although individual absorption, use and metabolism may vary. The elderly and athletes may need to supplement their intake of B12 and other B vitamins due to problems in absorption and increased needs for energy production. In cases of severe deficiency, B vitamins, especially B12, may also be delivered by injection to reverse deficiencies. Both type 1 and type 2 diabetics may also be advised to supplement thiamine based on high prevalence of low plasma thiamine concentration and increased thiamine clearance associated with diabetes. Also, folate deficiency in early embryo development has been linked to neural tube defects. Thus, women planning to become pregnant are usually encouraged to increase daily dietary folate intake or take a supplement.

Molecular functions

Deficiencies

Several named vitamin deficiency diseases may result from the lack of sufficient B vitamins. Deficiencies of other B vitamins result in symptoms that are not part of a named deficiency disease.

Side effects

Because water-soluble B vitamins are eliminated in the urine, taking large doses of certain B vitamins usually only produces transient side effects (only exception is pyridoxine). General side effects may include restlessness, nausea and insomnia. These side effects are almost always caused by dietary supplements and not foodstuffs.

Discovery

Related compounds

Many of the following substances have been referred to as vitamins as they were once believed to be vitamins. They are no longer considered as such, and the numbers that were assigned to them now form the "gaps" in the true series of B-complex vitamins described above (for example, there is no vitamin B4). Some of them, though not essential to humans, are essential in the diets of other organisms; others have no known nutritional value and may even be toxic under certain conditions.
 Vitamin B4: can refer to the distinct chemicals choline, adenine, or carnitine.
 Choline is synthesized by the human body, but not sufficiently to maintain good health, and is now considered an essential dietary nutrient.
 Adenine is a nucleobase synthesized by the human body.
 Carnitine is an essential dietary nutrient for certain worms, but not for humans.
 Vitamin B8: adenosine monophosphate (AMP), also known as adenylic acid. Vitamin B8 may also refer to inositol.
 Vitamin B10: para-aminobenzoic acid (pABA or PABA), a chemical component of the folate molecule produced by plants and bacteria, and found in many foods. It is best known as a UV-blocking sunscreen applied to the skin, and is sometimes taken orally for certain medical conditions.
 Vitamin B11: pteroylheptaglutamic acid (PHGA; chick growth factor). Vitamin Bc-conjugate was also found to be identical to PHGA. Derivative of folate ("pteroylmonoglutamic acid" in this nomenclature).
 Vitamin B13: orotic acid.
 Vitamin B14: cell proliferant, anti-anemia, rat growth factor, and antitumor pterin phosphate, named by Earl R. Norris. Isolated from human urine at 0.33ppm (later in blood), but later abandoned by him as further evidence did not confirm this. He also claimed this was not xanthopterin.
 Vitamin B15: pangamic acid, also known as pangamate. Promoted in various forms as a dietary supplement and drug; considered unsafe and subject to seizure by the US Food and Drug Administration.
 Vitamin B16: dimethylglycine (DMG) is synthesized by the human body from choline.
 Vitamin B17: pseudoscientific name for the poisonous compound amygdalin, also known as the equally pseudoscientific name "nitrilosides" despite the fact that it is a single compound. Amygdalin can be found in various plants, but is most commonly extracted from apricot pits and other similar fruit kernels. Amygdalin is hydrolyzed by various intestinal enzymes to form, among other things, hydrogen cyanide, which is toxic to human beings when exposed to a high enough dosage. Some proponents claim that amygdalin is effective in cancer treatment and prevention, despite its toxicity and a severe lack of scientific evidence.
 Vitamin B20: L-carnitine.
 Vitamin Bf: carnitine.
 Vitamin Bm: myo-inositol, also called "mouse antialopaecia factor".
 Vitamin Bp: "antiperosis factor", which prevents perosis, a leg disorder, in chicks; can be replaced by choline and manganese salts.
 Vitamin BT: carnitine.
 Vitamin Bv: a type of B6 other than pyridoxine.
 Vitamin BW: a type of biotin other than d-biotin.
 Vitamin Bx: an alternative name for both pABA (see vitamin B10) and pantothenic acid.

References